The Zion Inn was designed by Gilbert Stanley Underwood for the Utah Parks Company in Zion National Park as a cafeteria, gift shop and office for the tourist cabins surrounding it.  The inn was built in 1934 in the National Park Service Rustic style and was used by the Utah Parks Company until 1972, when the National Park Service remodeled it for use as a nature center. The structure features rubblestone pilasters at each corner with a "framing out" style infill. The roof is framed in log.

The Zion Inn was listed on the National Register of Historic Places in 1987. It was recently restored to the original Underwood exterior design.

References

External links

 at the National Park Service's NRHP database
Zion Nature Center

Park buildings and structures on the National Register of Historic Places in Utah
Commercial buildings completed in 1934
Gilbert Stanley Underwood buildings
National Park Service rustic in Utah
Nature centers in Utah
Hotels in Utah
Education in Washington County, Utah
1934 establishments in Utah
National Register of Historic Places in Washington County, Utah
National Register of Historic Places in Zion National Park